Tajudeen Yusuf popularly known as "TeeJay" (born on 25 August 1968) is a Nigerian politician from the Peoples Democratic Party. He represents Kabba/Bunu/Ijumu constituency in the House of Representatives of Nigeria, a post he was elected to in 2011. He is a former chairman, House Committee on Capital Market and Institutions.

Background 
Hon. TeeJay attended the popular St. Augustine's College Kabba, where he obtained his West African School Certificate/GCE in 1987.
In 1997, he graduated with a Bachelor of Science degree in economics from the University of Jos, Plateau State.

Political career 
In 2011, Honourable TeeJay ran for the Kabba-Bunu/Ijumu Federal Constituency seat in Nigeria's 7th National Assembly and won. In 2015, and 2019, he was re-elected to the same position. Between 2015 and 2019, he served as the Chairman of the House Committee on Capital Market & Institutions, while also serving as a member on the following Committees: Information Communication Technology Committee; Finance Committee; Ports, Harbours & Waterways; Information & National Orientation Committee; Sport Committee; House Committee on FERMA; the House Public Accounts Committee; and the House Committee on Human Rights.
Between 2011 and 2015, Hon. TeeJay served as the Deputy Chairperson of the House Committee on Information Communication Technology.

Honours 
Over the years, Honourable TeeJay has received the following awards in recognition of his public service achievements:

 House of Representatives Member of the Year, 2017, presented by City People Magazine
 Effective Representation Award, 2016, presented by Nigerian Union of Journalists (Kogi State Council)
 Pillars Award for Excellence, 2016, presented by Unijos Alumni Association (Abuja Chapter)
 North Central Lawmaker of the Year, 2014, presented by City People Magazine
 Most Outstanding Lawmaker on Empowerment & Constituency Development, North Central Zone, 2013, presented by Disciples of Democracy
 Lawmaker of the Year, 2012, presented by Nigeria Media Night Out Award
 Young Male Achiever of the Year, 2011, presented by Top Celebrities Magazine
 Most Promising Young Politician of the Year, 2009, presented by Top Celebrities Magazine
 Honourary Member Award, (since 2000) presented by University of Abuja Student Union Government
 Life Senator (since 1995), National Association of Nigerian Students, NANS.

References 

Peoples Democratic Party (Nigeria) politicians
Members of the House of Representatives (Nigeria)
Living people
1968 births
People from Kogi State